Whale City is Dry Jack's second album, released in 1979 by Inner City Records as IC 1075. It was recorded in July 1979 at Secret Sound Studios in New York City. Whale City was reissued on CD on August 17, 2010.

Track listing 
All songs written and composed by Chuck Lamb, except "Butch and Bruce Go Under the Sea" by Chuck Lamb and Rick Lamb. All compositions published by Ramapo Publishing Company/BMI.

 Hammerhead – 6:10
 Heads in the Cloud – 6:38
 Neener Nawner part one – 3:22
 Neener Nawner part two – 3:55
 Wimpy Thing – 4:40
 Butch and Bruce Go Under the Sea – 5:20
 Whale City – 12:40

Band Members 
 Chuck Lamb – acoustic piano, Fender-Rhodes electric piano, Mini-Moog, clavinet
 Rich Lamb – electric bass
 Rod Fleeman – electric guitar
 Jon Margolis – drums, percussion

Production 
 Dry Jack: Producers
 Michael Barry: Engineering
 Jason Corsaro: Assistant engineer
 Bob Ludwig: Mastering

References

External links

Inner City Records albums
1979 albums